Fiona O'Loughlin may refer to:

 Fiona O'Loughlin (comedian) (born 1963), Australian comedian
 Fiona O'Loughlin (politician), Irish politician